Donovan Hill was a  Brisbane, Australia, based architecture firm that was founded by Brian Donovan, Timothy Hill in 1992. The firm worked extensively in Brisbane, growing from a workforce of four to 50 within their 17-year existence. Donovan Hill's designs emphasized environmental impact and life cycle. The majority of their commissions were commercial, institutional and civic buildings, and included design concepts relating to interior fit out, landscape and master planning.

In 2013 Donovan Hill merged with BVN Architecture to form BVN Donovan Hill, now called BVN.

Background 

Brian Donovan, an independent architect, and Timothy Hill, who was employed by the Brisbane-based firm Lambert Smith, became partners to form Donovan Hill in order to design the C-House in 1992.  Donovan had previously worked for the Japanese architect Atsushi Kitagawara, whose emphasis on uniform geometry influenced many Donovan Hill designs.

The firm worked from the verandah of an old property in Kelvin Grove for a lengthy period before moving to Doggett Street, Fortitude Valley. Finally the firm established themselves in the former home of fashion label Eponymous on Bowen Street, Spring Hill.

The firm existed as a separate entity until 2012 when it merged with BVN Architecture, one of Australia's largest Architectural firms. BVN is commonly known for their work on sport facilities for the  2004 Athens Olympic Games, 2008 Beijing Olympic Games  and the  2012 London Olympic Games, as well as their work in  Australia  on Civic, Institutional, office, residential, tourist and urban design projects. When this merger occurred, both Timothy Hill and former director Paul Jones left Donovan Hill, but key staff members such as Brian Donovan, Damien Eckersley and Michael Hogg remained. Donovan Hill were able to bring to BVN a new sense of material as well as a more eco-friendly approach to residential projects.

Notable projects

C House 

Built in 1998 for an unpublished client, The C House has been the headline of the pre-merged Donovan Hill name. It was also cited by Phaidon (see Phaidon Press) as one of the great houses of the 20th Century.

Allowing the program to be divided into sup-plots inspires a sprawling effect in the house which creates intricate space between programmed areas. This plays with the site's views to frame them according to their most pleasing qualities. The implementing of this is a key concept in Donovan Hill's vision for this project.
An undulating floor plan or ‘typical terrain’ of the area surrounding and on the site, explores these ideas of sup-plots beyond conventional systems for further enhancement of special dimension and integration to the circulation plan – seemingly blending natural and the new built environment to a cohesive entity.

A key aspect in architecture is the future planning for buildings past their first completion dates. Essential program or nodes of the home have been arrayed in response to the ambiguity of the building's future. In plan it allows for intuitive enhancement and further spread to accommodate future prospective uses to ensure its lifespan. It is because of this design concept that the C House whilst being essentially mute from a demographic perspective and be specifically catered for. A family, a single or home office could occupy the C House without the occupant's acknowledgment of it being used incorrectly.

The C House is termed to be the product of Donovan Hill’s ‘redressing’ of international and local distinctions in architecture. They cite Australian domestic architecture as being stemmed from the wooden Japanese house and pavilion floor plan in conjunction, forming the late modern international style (International Style (architecture)).

D House 

The ‘D House’ built in New Farm, Queensland in 2000  for an unpublished client attempts to address the concept of the urban subdivision’s isolation through its design. It aims to show that individuality can still be obtained thought objective design solutions to re-parameterise the concept of urban living. To address this is a large ‘public’ room that faces and opens to a private, fence-less footpath and then to the streetscape via long window in conjunction with transitional common areas and open terraces.  
Concurrent with some other Donovan Hill Houses is the apparent illusion and subsequent realization of the capacity and program within the building. For example, some mistake the D House for a café due to the large opening from the ‘public’ room – in this way it directly responds to its vernacular (Vernacular architecture) and its design objectives. The design is more concerned with the streetscape and its position relative to add to the public life instead of focusing on picturesque qualities so that people may find it an enriching experience for the public domain.

Z House 

The Z House is built on the north sloping site of  Teneriffe  Hill  and is ingrained into its wider context by offering wide views to  Moreton Bay . The composition of the weathering materials, detailing of the building and the ventilation openings; exposed to a verdant landscape; is an attempt at depicting a metaphorical ruin. The ventilated openings have replaced windows, and an internal courtyard garden is inserted to enhance the blur of internal and external realms and articulate the illustration of a ruin.

The green courtyard becomes the focal point of the planning of the house with every room branching out from it. The houses internal layout consists of every main room existing on a different floor, all facing into the garden core  This configuration results in corridors being negated, an intention to increase the circulation fluidity, in order for the house to be read as a scaled down public space. Ultimately there is a cross-ventilation system established in this organisation by utilizing the breezes from Moreton Bay. In line with their previous works, there was a particular sensibility towards the houses environmental performance and they anchored in this consciousness through optimal building orientation.  The house frames external attributes  of typical homes and concentrates them into internal experiences with perceived changes through the opening and closing of spaces.

Other Notable Projects 

 AM60
 F2 House
 Ortiga
 Santos Place
 Seaspray Resort and Spa
 State Library of Queensland 
 Tank Bar + Restaurant
 The Happy Haus
 Translational Research Institute in Brisbane (2013)

Awards

D House 

 2001 AR + D Awards (UK) for Emerging Architecture ‘High Commendation’
 2001 RAIA National Awards ‘Robin Boyd Award for Residential Housing’
 2001 RAIA State Awards (Queensland) ‘Robin Dods Award for Residential Housing]’
 2001 RAIA State Awards (Queensland) ‘Residential Buildings - Inner Urban House’]
 2001 RAIA Regional Awards (Brisbane) ‘Commendation - Residential Buildings’
 2001 RAIA Regional Awards (Brisbane) ‘Brisbane House of the Year’

Z House 
 2010 Robin Dods Award for Residential Architecture

Other Awards
 Translational Research Institute - F.D.G. Stanley Award for Public Architecture and G.H.M. Addison Award for Interior Architecture

References

External links 
 BVN Donovan Hill Website
 Donovan Hill Website

Architecture firms of Australia
Design companies established in 1992
Australian companies established in 1992
2013 mergers and acquisitions
Australian companies disestablished in 2013
Design companies disestablished in 2013